Gandabad (also Romanized as Gandābād) is a village in Poshtdarband Rural District, in the Central District of Kermanshah County, Kermanshah Province, Iran. At the 2006 census, its population was 386, in 114 families.

References 

Populated places in Kermanshah County